Onomasti komodein (onomasti kōmōidein, "to ridicule by name in the manner of the comic poets") was an expression used in ancient Greece to denote a witty personal attack made with total freedom against the most notable individuals (see Aristophanes' attacks on Cleon, Socrates, Euripides) in order to expose their wrongful conduct.

An opinion which originated in the Peripatetic school is that onomasti komodein was the fundamental characterizing aspect of the ancient Greek comedy of the first period (known as Old Comedy).

See also
Satire

References
 LaFleur, R.A., "Horace and onomasti komodein: The Law of Satire," Aufstieg und Niedergang der Römischen Welt II.3.13 (1981) 1790-1826
 Mastromarco, Giuseppe (1994) Introduzione a Aristofane (Sesta edizione: Roma-Bari 2004).

Notes

Further reading
 Horace (35 BCE) Sermonum liber primus, Sermo IV "Eupolis atque Cratinus" vv. 1-5

Ancient Greek comedy
Greek political satire
Greek words and phrases